Lactarius fumosus, commonly known as the smoky milkcap, is a species of fungus in the family Russulaceae.

Taxonomy
The species was first described by American mycologist Charles Horton Peck in 1872. "Lactarius fumosus" var. fumosus is considered a synonym.

Lactarius fumosus is the type species of the section Fumosi of the subgenus Plinthogalus of the genus Lactarius.

It is commonly known as the "smoky milkcap".

Description
The margin (cap edge) is irregular, often wavy, and lobed or ribbed. The cap surface is dry, unpolished, azonate, usually becoming somewhat wrinkled with age, pale dingy yellow-brown to whitish overall, with a smoky tinge, sometimes with tawny olive, pinkish buff, or dull brown areas. The gills are attached to subdecurrent (running slightly down the length of the stem), narrow, crowded together, whitish, becoming dingy yellow-buff, staining reddish when bruised. The flesh is pale white, staining reddish-salmon when cut. Its odor is not distinctive, but the taste is variable: quickly acrid then mild then slowly staining acrid, or very slowly faintly acrid. The latex is white on exposure, unchanging, staining tissues reddish. The spore print is pinkish-buff. The edibility is unknown.

Microscopic characters
The spores are 6–8 by 6–8 µm, spherical or nearly so, ornamented with ridges that form a partial reticulum, prominences up to 1.5 µm high, hyaline (translucent), amyloid. The cap cuticle is a palisade of cylindrical to club-shaped cells.

Similar species
Lactarius musciola has darker colors, and its gills do not stain reddish where bruised. Lactarius fuliginosus differs in having broad subdistant gills.

Habitat and distribution
The fruit bodies of L. fumosus grow solitary, scattered, or in groups on the ground in woods from July–October. The fungus is widely distributed in eastern North America, and has also been reported from western Canada. Its frequency of occurrence is described as occasional. Its range extends south to northwestern Mexico, where it is found associated with Liquidambar, Magnolia, Acer, and Quercus species.

Bioactive compounds
Extracts of the fruit bodies are toxic to the corn earworm, Heliothis zea and the large milkweed bug, Oncopeltus fasciatus. The insecticidal activity is thought to be caused by compounds called chromenes.

See also
List of Lactarius species

References

Cited text

External links

fumosus
Fungi described in 1872
Fungi of North America
Taxa named by Charles Horton Peck